Piciw Minikanan Bay is a body of freshwater located in the western part of Gouin Reservoir, in the territory of the town of La Tuque, in the administrative area of the Mauricie, in the province of Quebec, in Canada.

This lake extends entirely in the canton of Poisson.

Recreotourism activities are the main economic activity of the sector. Forestry comes second. Recreational boating is particularly popular on this water, especially for sport fishing.

The Piciw Minikanan Bay hydrographic slope is served on the east side by the R1009 forest road (which also serves the entire western side of the Gouin Reservoir and the Berthelot River).

The surface of Piciw Minikanan Bay is usually frozen from mid-November to the end of April, however, safe ice circulation is generally from early December to late March. Water management at the Gouin Dam can lead to significant variations in the water level, particularly at the end of the winter when the water is lowered. The water level of this bay equilibrates with that of the Gouin Reservoir.

Geography

Toponymy
"Piciw Minikanan" is of aboriginal origin.

The French toponym "Baie Piciw Minikanan" was formalized on September 3, 1981, by the Commission de toponymie du Québec.

Notes and references

See also 

Bays of Quebec
La Tuque, Quebec